Lázár Lovász (born May 24, 1942) is a retired Hungarian athlete who competed in hammer throw. He won a bronze medal at the 1968 Summer Olympics, throwing 69.78 metres.

References

1942 births
Living people
People from Suceava County
Hungarian male hammer throwers
Olympic athletes of Hungary
Athletes (track and field) at the 1968 Summer Olympics
Olympic bronze medalists for Hungary
Medalists at the 1968 Summer Olympics
Olympic bronze medalists in athletics (track and field)